Mark Eugene Strom (born June 4, 1982 in Salem, Oregon, United States) is an American professional basketball player. He is a 6'3" (190 cm) guard who plays in the Liga Nacional de Baloncesto Profesional in Mexico.

Strom was a standout player at Mazama High School in Klamath Falls, Oregon. He played at Umpqua Community College for two years, where he was named second-team all-NWAACC, then transferred to San Jose Christian College, where he was first-team all-USCAA. After college, he played professionally in Mexico for the Bucaneros de Campeche, Santos de San Luis, Ángeles de Puebla and Cosmos De Tijuana of the Liga Nacional de Baloncesto Profesional (LNBP).

In 2009 he led Gonyeli OŞAN to the Super Cup Finals in the North Cyprus Premier League. He was averaged 19.3 points and 4 assists per match. 

He then returned to Mexico to play a season with the Pioneros de Los Mochis of the CIBACOPA.

References

External links
 Eurobasket profile

Living people
1982 births
American expatriate basketball people in Cyprus
American men's basketball players
American sportspeople of Mexican descent
Ángeles de Puebla (basketball) players
Basketball players from Oregon
Bucaneros de Campeche players
Galgos de Tijuana (basketball) players
Pioneros de Los Mochis players
Santos de San Luis players
Sportspeople from Salem, Oregon